Kublai Khan is an American hardcore/metalcore band from Sherman, Texas. The group formed in the summer of 2009 and has released four albums.

Career 
Kublai Khan self-released their first EP, Youth War, in 2010. In February 2014, Kublai Khan signed to Artery Recordings. On April 29, 2014, the band released their debut full-length album titled Balancing Survival and Happiness. The album was listed in Alternative Press's "The Best Albums of 2014 so far" list. On November 27, 2015, Kublai Khan released their second album titled New Strength. In July 2017, Kublai Khan signed to Rise Records, and on September 29, 2017, they released their third full-length album titled Nomad. In 2019, the band released their fourth full-length album Absolute, gathering critical acclaim across the genre for the crushing vocals of the bands vocalist Matthew Honeycutt, the winning heavy riff formula and powerful lyrical themes.

In February 2022, the band announced the upcoming release of their new EP Lowest Form of Animal, which was later released on April 1, 2022.

Musical style and lyrics 
Kublai Khan play a style of metalcore reminiscent of the early 1990s metallic hardcore scene (Integrity, Earth Crisis, All Out War, Hatebreed). The band employs heavy, slow breakdowns, heavily downtuned guitars and raspy vocals.

They also touch on socially conscious issues such as racism ("Color Code", "No Kin"), human rights, violent police profiling/police brutality ("True Fear"), organized religion ("B.C."), depression ("Belligerent"), social anxiety ("The Hammer"), and violence against women/the sex trade ("Swan Song").

Band members 

Matt Honeycutt – vocals
Nolan Ashley – guitar/vocals
Eric English – bass/vocals
Isaac Lamb – drums
Jayson Braffett – touring guitar

Discography

Studio albums 
Balancing Survival and Happiness (2014, Artery)
New Strength (2015, Artery)
Nomad (2017, Rise)
Absolute (2019, Rise)

EPs 
Youth War (2010, self-released)
Lowest Form of Animal (2022, Rise)

Notes

References

External links

Metalcore musical groups from Texas
Musical groups from Texas
Musical groups established in 2009
Hardcore punk groups from Texas